The Heathen Chemistry World Tour was a concert tour by English band Oasis, which took place between 2002 and 2003. The tour was in promotion of their record Heathen Chemistry. While the tour was successful, it was plagued by major incidents including lead singer Liam Gallagher's voice giving out during three of the band's gigs and resulted in him walking off stage and guitarist Noel Gallagher had to take over on vocals, a car crash that left Noel, bassist Andy Bell and touring keyboardist Jay Darlington in hospital and resulted in the North American leg getting cut short and a bar brawl in Munich, Germany involving Liam, drummer Alan White and several members of their crew that left Liam getting his teeth knocked out, White getting brain scans, Liam getting fined with £35,000 and the German leg getting pushed into March 2003.

Set list
This set list is representative of the performance on 5 July 2002 in London, England. It does not represent all concerts for the duration of the tour.

"Fucking In The Bushes"
"Hello"
"The Hindu Times"
"Hung In A Bad Place"
"Go Let It Out"
"Columbia"
"Morning Glory"
"Stop Crying Your Heart Out"
"Little by Little"
"D'You Know What I Mean"
"Cigarettes And Alcohol"
"Live Forever"
"Better Man"
"She's Electric"
"Born On A Different Cloud"
"Acquiesce"
Encore:
"Force Of Nature"
"Don't Look Back In Anger"
"Some Might Say"
"My Generation"

Other songs performed:
"Supersonic"
"Fade Away"
"Gas Panic!"
"Slide Away"
"Champagne Supernova"
"Rock 'n' Roll Star"
"I Am The Walrus"
"Whatever"
"The Masterplan"
"One Way Road"
"Talk Tonight"
"Cast No Shadow"
"Half The World Away"
"Wonderwall"
"Hey Hey, My My (Into the Black)"
"Bittersweet Symphony"
"You've Got the Heart of a Star"
"Married With Children"
"Bring It On Down"
"Songbird"
Some people claim "Just Getting Older" was performed at the Cardiff International Arena on 9 December 2002, but this can't be confirmed.

Shows

Cancellations and rescheduled shows

Notes

References

2002 concert tours
2003 concert tours
Oasis (band) concert tours